ʿAlī ibn Muḥammad ibn ʿAbbās (923–1023) also known as Abū Ḥayyān al-Tawḥīdī was an Arab or Persian and one of the most influential intellectuals and thinkers of the 10th century. Yāqūt al-Ḥamawī described him as "the philosopher of litterateurs and the litterateur of philosophers." However, he was neglected and ignored by the historians of his era. This neglect continued until Yāqūt wrote his book Muʿjam al-Udabāʾ, which contained a biographical outline of at-Tawḥīdī, relying primarily on what al-Tawḥīdī had written about himself.

Life
There are differing views on the dates of al-Tawḥīdī's birth and death. According to Tārīkh-i Sistān, he was born in 923 Near Baghdad or Fars. Al-Tawḥīdī had a difficult childhood. He was born into a poor family who sold dates called tawḥīd (hence his surname), and spent much of his childhood as an orphan in the care of his uncle, who treated him poorly.

After completing his studies, al-Tawḥīdī worked as a scribe for various parties in various cities in the Muslim world. His last known regular assignment was for Ebn Saʿdān, for whom he worked from 980 until Saʿdān's execution in 985. During this time, he was a member of a literary circle centred around Abū Solaymān Manṭeqī Seǰestānī. Most of what is known about the circle is through al-Tawḥīdī's writings.

After Saʿdān's execution, al-Tawḥīdī doesn't appear to have had regular work as a scribe, although he continued to write. During his final twenty years of life, he lived in poverty. He is known to have been alive in 1009, and likely died in 1023 in Shiraz.

Works
Al-Tawḥīdī was highly critical of himself and dissatisfied with much of his work. He burned many of his own books later in his life. Nevertheless, he left a set of literary, philosophical, and Sufi works, which were distinctive in the history of the Arabic literature. His most important works are:
Al-Baṣā’ir wa al-Dhakhā’ir
Al-Hawamil wa al-Shawamil
Al-Imtāʿ wa al-Mu’ānasa, Book of Enjoyment and Bonhomie, is a collection of anecdotes and includes a chapter on zoology possibly based on Timotheus of Gaza's book on animals.
Al-Isharat al-Ilahiyya
Al-Muqabasat
Al-Sadaqa wa al-Sadiq
Mathalib al-Wazirain, Book on the Foibles of the Two Ministers, which is a commentary on the political and cultural infighting of his day.

References

Salah NATIJ, "La nuit inaugurale d'al-Imatâ' wa l-mu'ânasa d'Abu Hayyân al-Tawhidi,une leçon magistrale d'adab", Revue Arabica, Vol. 55, No.2, 2008 = http://maduba.free.fr/Sur_Tawhidi.pdf
I. Keilani, Abú Hayyán al-Tawhidi (in French), Beirut, 1950.

923 births
1023 deaths
Islamic philosophers
Writers from Baghdad
11th-century philosophers
Zoologists of the medieval Islamic world
10th-century philosophers